Immediate Mobilization Networks (in Spanish: Fuerzas Inmediatas de Movilización) were an alleged paramilitary organization formed by Venezuelan President Hugo Chavez to remain in control of the country if he was defeated in the 2012 presidential election.

History 
Its objectives were to abort the opposition rallies before they could be prepared, detection of opposition leaders, organizing street protests and resistance and control of territory.

Chávez militias have been responsible (along with the Army) from the custody of the electoral process (polling security, custody of the votes and his move to places count). A first contingent would be deployed in 51% of polling stations, the rest at 49%, precisely in many of the places where the opposition is strong.

Of its approximately 3,800 members, not everyone would have military targets. Some of them could be limited to monitoring process, but other functions provided for these groups, composed of small teams of five to seven members, require violence. Venezuelan Army sources said that in June they started handing out about 8,000 AK-103 to this group.

They were formed by "social intelligence teams" and "communicators in action" ("street propaganda and guerrilla internet") and of "territorial control equipment," constituted "as Rapid Action Force and Action street, with ability to block or enable critical road corridors, geographic areas or localities" and "defend the spaces adjacent to state institutions."

Their tactics were based on Iranian Basij units whose performance was decisive to abort the 2009 Iranian presidential election protests in 2009, and used a complex system of communication encryption.

See also 

 Colectivo (Venezuela)
 La Piedrita
 Units of Battle Hugo Chávez
 Committees for the Defense of the Revolution

References

Bolivarian Revolution
Hugo Chávez
Paramilitary organizations based in Venezuela